Mufindi is a town in Mufindi District in the Iringa Region of the Tanzanian Southern Highlands. It is located in the Boma/Mafinga ward.  , the population of the town was about 5,000.

Notes

Populated places in Iringa Region